Oleksandr Filiayev (26 August 1934 – 21 June 2019) was a Ukrainian professional football player who played as striker and is known as the first captain in the history of FC Karpaty Lviv.

Playing and coaching career
Filiayev played in Moscow clubs' Zenit and Lokomotiv, before transferred to army club in Lviv – SKVO, that after was renamed as SKA. When in 1963 in Lviv was created a new football club Karpaty, he joined it and become the first captain of this club.

He made his debut for Karpaty in the winning game against FC Lokomotiv Gomel on 21 April 1963.

After his retirement he worked as an assistant manager and a teacher of the physical training in the School n6 in Lviv.

He died in Lviv on 21 June 2019.

References

External links
 

1934 births
2019 deaths
Footballers from Moscow
Soviet footballers
Ukrainian footballers
FC Lokomotiv Moscow players
SKA Lviv players
FC Karpaty Lviv players
Soviet Top League players
Soviet First League players
Soviet Second League players
Association football forwards
Soviet football managers
Ukrainian people of Russian descent